Nattestad is a surname. Notable people with the surname include:

Ole Knudsen Nattestad (1807–1886), Norwegian-American leader and pioneer immigrant settler
Sonni Nattestad (born 1994), Faroese footballer